Ayodhya is a constituency of the Uttar Pradesh Legislative Assembly covering the city of Ayodhya and Faizabad in the Ayodhya district (Ayodhya district) of Uttar Pradesh, India. It is one of five assembly constituencies in the Faizabad Lok Sabha constituency. Since 2008, this assembly constituency is numbered 275 amongst 403 constituencies.

Bharatiya Janata Party member Ved Prakash Gupta is the incumbent MLA, who won in the 2022 Uttar Pradesh Legislative Assembly election defeating Samajwadi Party candidate Tej Narayan Pandey by a margin of 19,990 votes.

Election Result

2022
Samajwadi Party candidate "Tej Narayan Pandey" received 40.40% (93,424) votes, 14.39 from 2017

2017 General Elections

References

External links
 

Assembly constituencies of Uttar Pradesh
Ayodhya